, stylized as N3II: Ninety-Nine Nights, is a role-playing video game with hack and slash game mechanics set in a high fantasy game universe, where a demon army is rising with one million troops. It is a sequel to Ninety-Nine Nights and was published by Konami. The game was announced at the TGS 2008 conference - a demo for the game was released on the Xbox Live marketplace on May 27, 2010, and the game release between June and September in North America, Japan, and European regions.

Gameplay

Development
The game was unveiled at Microsoft Game Studios's TGS 2008 press conference, for Xbox 360.

Developed by feelplus, the game's art style is noticeably darker than its predecessor.

At the Konami E3 (2010) press conference, the lead producer of the series, Tak Fujii noted that the sequel has been vastly improved technically, allowing hundreds of enemies to be present on screen in one shot. Some of the main changes the sequel introduces include an online co-op mode, leaderboards and brand new difficulty levels which make the game even harder. He also announced that the game has more than 1 million troops.

After the press conference Tak Fujii was also interviewed by G4TV and GameSpot.

Reception

The game received "unfavorable" reviews according to the review aggregation website Metacritic. Both IGN and GameSpot  criticized the gameplay and plot, as well as poor lip-syncing, noting an absence of challenge in core gameplay as well as frustrating boss fights. In Japan, however, Famitsu gave it a score of two eights and two sevens, while Famitsu X360 gave it a score of two nines and two eights.

Steve Butts of The Escapist gave the game two stars out of five, saying, "Ninety-Nine Nights II has the fast combat, loads of enemies and fantasy setting that you expect from this genre, but it just misses the mark in terms of fun. The fighting is tedious and the enemies are either unchallenging peons or hulking monsters who can crush you the instant you make a mistake." David Wolinsky of The A.V. Club gave it a D, saying, "There's no getting around the monotonous mayhem, and N3II unfortunately assumes that players are as mindless as the limited fun it offers." Roger Hargreaves of Metro gave it two out of ten, calling it an "Impossibly tedious Dynasty Warriors clone that offers up not one ounce of entertainment for enduring its soul-shatteringly dull world and combat."

References

External links
 

2010 video games
Crowd-combat fighting games
Hack and slash games
Konami games
Feelplus games
Q Entertainment games
Video game sequels
Xbox 360-only games
Multiplayer and single-player video games
Xbox 360 games
Video games developed in Japan